The 2005–06 season was the 103rd in the history of the Southern League, which is an English football competition featuring semi-professional and amateur clubs from the South West, South Central and Midlands of England and South Wales.

At the end of the season Eastern and Western divisions were restructured after a single Division One of the Isthmian League was divided into Division One North and Division One South, while large number of the clubs left to the Isthmian League. For the next season regional divisions were renamed Division One Midlands and Division One South & West.

Premier Division
The Premier Division consisted of 22 clubs, including 16 clubs from last season, and six new clubs:
Three clubs were transferred from the Isthmian League Premier Division:
Cheshunt
Northwood
Salisbury City

Three were promoted from the Western Division:
Evesham United
Mangotsfield United
Yate Town

Salisbury City won the division and were promoted to the Conference along with play-off winners Bedford Town, both clubs for the first time in their history. Aylesbury United, Chesham United and Evesham United were relegated to the Division One.

League table

Play-offs

Stadia and locations

Eastern Division
The Eastern Division consisted of 22 clubs, including 15 clubs from last season, and seven new clubs:
Two clubs transferred from Western Division:
Corby Town
Rothwell Town

Two clubs promoted from Isthmian League Division Two:
Enfield
Ilford

Plus:
Enfield Town, promoted from the Essex Senior League
Potters Bar Town, promoted from the Spartan South Midlands League
Stamford, relegated from the Premier Division

Boreham Wood won the division and returned to the Premier Division of the Isthmian League after relegation in 2003. Runners-up Corby Town and play-off winners Stamford promoted to the Premier Division. At the end of the season a single Division One of the Isthmian League was divided into Division One North and Division One South. Fifteen Eastern division clubs left the Southern League and joined new divisions, while Eastern and Western divisions were renamed Division One Midlands and Division One South & West.

League table

Play-offs

* after extra time

Stadia and locations

Western Division

The Western Division consisted of 22 clubs, including 15 clubs from last season, and seven new clubs:
Three clubs relegated from the Premier Division:
Dunstable Town
Hemel Hempstead Town
Solihull Borough

Two clubs transferred from the Eastern Division:
Beaconsfield SYCOB,
Leighton Town

Plus:
Rushall Olympic, promoted from the Midland Alliance 
Willenhall Town, transferred from the Northern Premier League Division One

Clevedon Town won the title and were promoted to the Premier Division along with play-off winners Hemel Hempstead Town, returning after relegation in 2004. Runners-up Ashford Town were promoted and transferred to the Isthmian League Premier Division. Thame United finished bottom and were the only Southern League club relegated from the league. Remaining clubs were divided between the newly formed Division One Midlands and Division One South & West.

League table

Play-offs

Stadia and locations

See also
Southern Football League
2005–06 Isthmian League
2005–06 Northern Premier League

References

External links
Football Club History Database

Southern Football League seasons
7